Oxytelus migrator is a species of rove beetle widely spread in Asia and Europe. It is found in China, Hong Kong, Japan, Vietnam, Thailand, Malaysia, Indonesia, and Sri Lanka.

Description
Generally a smaller beetle, where the male is about 2.8 mm and female is 2.6 mm in length. Body is brown to pitchy. Head and pronotum are darker brown. Elytral bases are black in color. Mandibles are slender and slightly curved. In male, head is sub-pentagonal. Clypeus flat, and slightly protruding. Epistomal suture with incurved lateral portions. Eyes are convex, with coarse facets. Mandible is slender and slightly curved. Pronotum transverse. Elytra punctate and rugose. Abdomen coriaceous and covered with dense fine hairs. In female, head is more triangular. Mandibles are larger and more robust than male. Spermatheca U-shaped and bent twice.

References 

Staphylinidae
Insects of Sri Lanka
Insects of India
Insects described in 1904